The  was the highest organ within the Imperial Japanese Navy. In charge of planning and operations, it was headed by an Admiral headquartered in Tokyo.

History
Created in 1893, the Navy General Staff took over operational (as opposed to administrative) authority over the Imperial Japanese Navy from the Navy Ministry. It was responsible for the planning and execution of national defense strategy. Through the Imperial General Headquarters it reported directly to the Emperor, not to the Prime Minister, National Diet or even the Navy Ministry. It was always headed by an admiral on active duty, and was based in Tokyo.

"The ministry was responsible for the naval budget, ship construction, weapons procurement, personnel, relations with the Diet and the cabinet and broad matters of naval policy. The General Staff directed the operations of the fleet and the preparation of war plans".

After the Washington Naval Conference of 1921–22, where Japan agreed to keep the size of its fleet smaller than that of the United Kingdom and the United States, the Imperial Japanese Navy became divided into the mutually hostile Fleet Faction and Treaty Faction political cliques. The Navy Ministry tended to be pro-Treaty Faction and was anxious to maintain the Anglo-Japanese Alliance. However the Navy General Staff came to be dominated by the Fleet faction, and gradually gained ascendancy in the 1930s with increasing Japanese militarism. The Navy General Staff pushed through the attack on Pearl Harbor against the wishes of the more diplomatic Navy Ministry.

After 1937, both the Navy Minister and the Chief of the Navy General Staff were members of the Imperial General Headquarters.

With the defeat of the Empire of Japan in World War II, the Navy General Staff was abolished together with the Imperial Japanese Navy by the American occupation authorities in November 1945 and was not revived by the post-war Constitution of Japan.

Organization
The General Staff was organized as follows:
1st Department: Operations Bureau
1st Section: Operations
2nd Section: Training 
2nd Department: Weapons and Mobilization Bureau
3rd Section: Weapons
4th Section: Mobilization
3rd Department: Intelligence Bureau
5th Section: Intelligence for America
6th Section: Intelligence for China
7th Section: Intelligence for Soviet Union
8th Section: Intelligence for UK and Europe
4th Department: Communications Bureau
9th Section: Communications
10th Section: Cryptography

Chiefs of the General Staff

See also
 Ministry of the Navy (Japan)

Notes

References

Bibliography

External links
"Foreign Office Files for Japan and the Far East". Adam Matthew Publications. Accessed 2 March 2005.

Imperial Japanese Navy
Japan